Orobanche fasciculata is a species of broomrape known by the common name clustered broomrape. It is native to much of western and central North America from Alaska to northern Mexico to the Great Lakes region, where it grows in many types of habitat. It is a parasite growing attached to the roots of other plants, usually members of the Asteraceae such as Artemisia; and other genera such as Eriodictyon and Eriogonum. This plant produces one or more stems from a bulbous root, growing erect to a maximum of about 20 centimeters in height. The stems, leaves and five-lobed flowers are covered by sticky hairs. As a parasite taking its nutrients from a host plant, it lacks chlorophyll as well as a water-storage system. It is variable in color, often yellowish or purple. The flower is yellowish or purplish in color.

Uses
Among the Zuni people  the powdered plant is inserted into the rectum as a hemorrhoid remedy.

References

External links
Jepson Manual Treatment
USDA Plants Profile
Photo gallery

fasciculata
Flora of the Northwestern United States
Flora of the Northern United States
Flora of Northwestern Mexico
Flora of the Western United States
Flora of California
Plants used in traditional Native American medicine
Least concern biota of Mexico
Least concern flora of the United States